The Tuscan regional election of 2010 took place on 28–29 March 2010.

After two consecutive terms, President Claudio Martini of the Democratic Party chose not run for a third term. His successor, Enrico Rossi, was defeated in a landslide his centre-right opponent Monica Faenzi. The Democrats were by far the largest party, although they lost ground from previous elections.

Minor candidates included Francesco Bosi for the Union of the Centre, Alfonso De Virgilis for the Italian Radicals and Ilario Palmisani for New Force.

Electoral system
Tuscany uses its own legislation of 2004 to elect its Council. The councillors are elected in provincial constituencies by proportional representation using the largest remainder method with a Droop quota and close lists.

In this system parties are grouped in alliances, and the alliance which receives a plurality of votes elects all its candidates, its leader becoming the President of Tuscany.

Council apportionment
According to the official 2001 Italian census, the 33 Council seats which must be covered by proportional representation are so distributed between Tuscan provinces; the highest number of candidates in each list by province is this:

The allocation is fixed. Remaining seats and votes after nominal distribution, are all grouped at regional level and divided by party lists. The consequent division of these seats at provincial level usually change the original apportionment.

Parties and candidates

Results
The election was won by President Enrico Rossi of the Democratic Party, supported by the center-left coalition.

Lega Nord Toscana won three seats, its best performance in party history to that point.

The Democratic Party was confirmed as the largest party in the region with 42% of the vote, although with a decline of six points, while The People of Freedom took 27%. The election was the only one other than the 2005 election in which the center-left coalition improved its performance.

2010 elections in Italy
2010 regional election
2010 regional
March 2010 events in Italy